The Nigerian Railway River class locomotive had a 2-8-2 wheel arrangement.

History 

The first were built in 1947 by Vulcan Foundry, and several additional orders were delivered in later years by different manufacturers.

They were fitted with Vacuum brakes supplied by the Vacuum Brake Company.

Similar locomotives 

Similar locomotives were built for Malawi and East Africa.

See also 
EAR 29 class
EAR 30 class
EAR 31 class
 Preservation

References 

River class
2-8-2 locomotives
Vulcan Foundry locomotives
3 ft 6 in gauge locomotives of Nigeria
Scrapped locomotives